The Naltar Wildlife Sanctuary is a protected area located in the Naltar Valley near Nomal, in Gilgit-Baltistan, Pakistan. The Sanctuary was created on 22 November 1975 and consists of a steep-sided forested valley with high mountains on either side. A small number of Astor markhor are found here as well as other large mammals.

Location

The sanctuary
Naltar Wildlife Sanctuary was created on 22 November 1975. Naltar Valley is a fluvio-glacial valley with a U-shaped cross section higher up and a V-shaped cross section lower down. It is aligned from northwest to southeast and has high mountains on either side.

Flora
The sanctuary is forested, there being a luxurious growth of mixed montane broadleaf and coniferous forest at lower altitudes, and montane coniferous forest higher up. Coniferous species present include Picea and Juniperus. Deciduous trees present include Fraxinus, Olea, Pistacia, Sageretia, Betula, Salix, Populus and Krascheninnikovia ceratoides. Herbs present include Artemisia, Haloxylon and Stipa.

Fauna
A small number of Astor markhor (Capra falconeri falconeri), an endangered species of wild goat, lives in the reserve. Other large mammals present include the  Alpine ibex (Capra ibex), the snow leopard (Panthera uncia), the brown bear (Ursus arctos), the grey wolf (Lupus lupus), the red fox (Vulpes vulpes), the beech marten (Martes foina) and the leopard cat (Prionailurus bengalensis). About 35 species of bird have been recorded in the sanctuary, including the Brooks's leaf-warbler (Phylloscopus subviridis).

References

Wildlife sanctuaries of Pakistan
Protected areas of Gilgit-Baltistan
Gilgit District